Sean Martin (born in Weston-super-Mare, England, in 1966) is an Anglo-Irish writer and film director. He has written popular books on the Knights Templar and the Cathars, and appeared on History Channel documentaries such as Decoding the Past: The Templar Code and in Channel 5's Secrets of the Cross: The Trial of the Knights Templar.

Martin studied film and history in Plymouth, and later lived in London. He is also a poet, and has had a number of poems published in various magazines in the UK and Ireland, and also won the 2011 Wigtown Poetry Prize. His book The Gnostics: The First Christian Heretics, was on the early Christian Gnostics. He wrote a book on new wave cinema, published in 2013.

Works
The Knights Templar: The History and Myths of the Legendary Military Order (2005)
The Cathars: The Most Successful Heresy of the Middle Ages (2005)
Andrei Tarkovsky (2005, Pocket Essential series)
The Gnostics: The First Christian Heretics (2007, Pocket Essential series)
Alchemy and Alchemists (2006)
The Black Death (2009)
The Cathars: Their History and Myths Revealed (2013)
New Waves in Cinema (2013)
A Short History of Disease (2015, ISBN 978-1843444190)
The Girl Who Got onto the Ferry in Citizen Kane (2018, ISBN 978-1911132349)

Filmography
Mystery Play (2001), a comic drama about the occult history of London, inspired by the work of Philip K. Dick, and also the Dekalog of Krzysztof Kieślowski. The film features an original score by key PJ Harvey collaborator John Parish.
The Notebooks of Cornelius Crow (2005), a psychological thriller about the occult history of London. The film reflects Martin's interest in psychogeography.
Genius Loci (2007), a short documentary detailing the mysteries and famous characters associated with Weston-super-Mare. Part of the Super-8 Cities Project – DVD released in 2007.
Lanterna Magicka: Bill Douglas and the Secret History of Cinema (2009), a documentary, co-directed and co-produced with Louise Milne, about the Scottish filmmaker Bill Douglas, his collection of cinema memorabilia and his final film, Comrades (1987)
The Druids: Travels in Deep England (2011), a documentary, directed by Louise Milne and produced by Sean Martin. Focussing on a grove of Druids who meet at the stone circle of Stanton Drew, the film features interviews with academic Ronald Hutton and science-fiction writer Liz Williams.
A Boat Retold (2011), a short documentary about boats, storytelling and travel, co-directed with Louise Milne. Shot on the Isle of Lewis, the film follows a journey made to the Shiants by writer Robert Macfarlane and poet/artist Ian Stephen.
Folie à Deux (2012), a feature film starring Adam Napier, Sally Scott, and Chris Dunne, the film tells the story of an online date with a dark secret.
Tarkovsky's Andrei Rublev: A Journey (2018), documentary, co-directed with Louise Milne, about the Russian filmmaker Andrei Tarkovksy's second feature film, featuring interviews with cast and crew members. Released by Criterion in 2018.
Charlie Chaplin Lived Here (2019), documentary, co-directed with Louise Milne, reconstructing an unfinished 8mm film by Scottish filmmaker Bill Douglas about Charlie Chaplin's London. Douglas's footage was shot in 1969 in Kennington, south London, and features the last known footage of Chaplin's house at 3 Pownall Terrace as it as being demolished. Martin & Milne reconstruct the documentary as Douglas may have intended it. The film features interviews with Douglas's friend Peter Jewell, and former Cinema Bookshop proprietor, Fred Zentner.
Blues for James Whitney (2020). Experimental short film dedicated to the American experimental filmmaker James Whitney (1921-1982). Shot in Japan.
The Dream in the Mirror (2021), documentary, co-directed with Louise Milne, about Tarkovksy's film The Mirror (1975). Released by Criterion.

External links
Official site

 Review of Gnostics, The Independent, 11 March 2007

English film directors
English writers
Living people
1966 births
People from Weston-super-Mare